Anthony Paul Ghelfi (born August 23, 1961), is an American former professional baseball starting pitcher, who played in Major League Baseball (MLB) for the Philadelphia Phillies. Ghelfi was drafted in the first round (14th overall) in the 1980 Major League Baseball draft.

Ghelfi attended La Crosse Central High School in La Crosse, WI. He then went on to Iowa Western Junior College where the Phillies selected him in the first round of the 1980 MLB draft.

Ghelfi played for Philadelphia’s big league team for only 2 weeks, in September , enjoying moderate success, in the process.

Ghelfi made his Major League debut, on September 1, 1983 as the starting pitcher when the Phillies hosted the San Francisco Giants. After surrendering a run before recording the game's first out, he settled in and was the winning pitcher, in the Phillies' 4–2 victory, striking out 6, along the way. On September 6, in his second MLB start, Ghelfi pitched 4 scoreless innings, giving up 5 hits, and striking out 4, as the Phillies went on to beat the New York Mets, 2–0. However, since he did not pitch the requisite 5 innings necessary, in order for the game’s starter to be credited with a win, he left with a no-decision. Ghelfi did not fare as well in his third, and final, big league start, on September 13, against the Mets when he surrendered 3 runs, in 5 innings of work. Although he struck out 4, Ghelfi was the losing pitcher, as the Phillies lost 5–1.

Following his brief MLB stint, Ghelfi finished out his professional career in the minor league systems of the Phillies (–), Cleveland Indians (–), and San Diego Padres.

References

External links

Sportspeople from La Crosse, Wisconsin
Baseball players from Wisconsin
Philadelphia Phillies players
Iowa Western Reivers baseball players
Major League Baseball pitchers
1961 births
Living people
La Crosse Central High School alumni
Colorado Springs Sky Sox players
Helena Phillies players
Kinston Indians players
Las Vegas Stars (baseball) players
Peninsula Pilots players
Portland Beavers players
Reading Phillies players
Spartanburg Phillies players
Williamsport Bills players